Mora Piya (meaning My love) is a 2013 Pakistani drama serial broadcast on Geo TV. It was telecast on Zindagi TV channel in India as Piya Re, airing from 7 January 2015.

Plot
It tells the tale of Faisal (Adeel Hussain) and Ujala (Amina Sheikh). Faisal is an investigative journalists and researching on a land mafia case. The night their wedding takes place, Faisal and Ujala receive a call from Faisal's boss informing them about Ali's death a cameraman working with Faisal on the case. On their way to the hospital, the goons behind land mafia stop their car and kidnap them and Ujala is raped by a gangster as revenge for reporting their illegal activities.

Problems arise between Ujaala and Faisal when Ujaala gets pregnant due to the rape. At first Ujaala and Faisal think that Ujaala should abort the baby, but later Ujaala feels that aborting the baby is wrong. Faisal and Ujaala argue continuously due to this. Eventually Faisal agrees.

Ujaala gives birth to a boy, who is named Azaan. The tension between Ujaala and Faisal continues as Faisal cannot accept Azaan, But cannot let go of Ujaala either as he loves her. Faisal keeps avoiding Azaan all the time and always puts up the reason as work.

4 years pass, Azaan is 4 years old and thinks that his father doesn't love him. After an argument between Ujaala and Faisal, Ujaala leaves Azaan with Faisal leaving behind a letter in which she states that Azaan is now Faisal's responsibility. But later Ujaala returns when Azaan gets lost due to Faisal. Azaan is found by the police who take him to his grandfather. Ujaala and Faisal's parents get angry on them for not being able to take care of Azaan. Eventually, Faisal confesses only to his father that Azaan is not his son and all the events that changed his and Ujaala's life. But Faisal's father doesn't blame Azaan and accepts him wholeheartedly.

On Faisal's insistence, his father convinces Ujaala to send Azaan to a boarding school. Ujaala reluctantly agrees. Azaan is sent to a Boarding School. Faisal eventually realizes that no matter how much he tries to push Azaan away from their life, it is not possible as Ujaala loves Azaan wholeheartedly. Ujaala also shows the letters and cards that Azaan makes for Faisal on Father's Day. Faisal realizes that Azaan is not at fault. Unable to face the guilt, he decides to leave to England, but before going, he brings Azaan back from Boarding School on Azaan's birthday, which makes Azaan and Ujaala happy. When Faisal is about to leave, Azaan comes running and tells him not to go. Faisal agrees. Faisal accepts Azaan wholeheartedly, and Ujaala gets happy seeing the duo. In the last scene, Faisal is shown playing football with Azaan, as Ujaala watches them. Ujaala is shown to be pregnant. The trio unites and the show ends on a happy note.

Cast
Aamina Sheikh As Ujaala
Adeel Hussain As Faisal

References

External links 
 Mora Piya
 Newscitech Entertainment

Geo TV original programming
2013 Pakistani television series debuts
Urdu-language telenovelas
Pakistani telenovelas
Zee Zindagi original programming